The LBO (or leveraged buyout) valuation model estimates the current value of a business to a "financial buyer", based on the business's forecast financial performance. An already-completed five-year financial forecast and two assumptions are all that are necessary to create a first draft of a comprehensive LBO valuation of the business.

From a processing standpoint, the model makes a copy of the already completed five-year forecast and uses that copy (and any changes made to it) for projecting future operating results. As such, the original forecast is preserved.

The model analyzes the value of a business from the point of view of a "financial buyer" who owns no other businesses in that industry and, therefore, expects all of its investment return to result solely from the future operations of the business. The LBO valuation model assumes that the buyer has investigated a business and operating plan and believes the business will achieve the financial results that have been forecast.

From a timing standpoint, the LBO valuation model assumes that the financial buyer intends to purchase the business at the beginning of year two of a five-year forecast and intends to own the business for the ensuing four years, and then sell the business.

In order to generalize the analysis across a potentially infinite range of "deal" attributes, the model assumes the financial buyer is buying only the assets of the business and assuming none of its liabilities. Therefore, the seller of the business needs to pay off all of the liabilities of the business (and in all likelihood, any tax owed as a result of the gain realized on the sale of the assets) from the purchase price paid by the financial buyer.

References

Private equity